Indian Creek is a stream in Bourbon and Linn counties, in the U.S. state of Kansas.

Indian Creek was named from the fact an Indian settlement stood near its mouth.

See also
List of rivers of Kansas

References

Rivers of Bourbon County, Kansas
Rivers of Linn County, Kansas
Rivers of Kansas